Yervand "Kochar" Kocharyan, also known as Ervand Kochar (1899 – 1979) was a prominent sculptor and modern artist of the twentieth century and a founder of Painting in Space art movement. The Ervand Kochar Museum is located in Yerevan, Armenia and showcases much of his work.

Biography

Early life and career 
Kochar was born in Tiflis, Russian Empire on June 15, 1899, to Simon Kocharian of Shushi and Pheocia Martirosian. He graduated in 1918 from Nersisian School, and, between 1915 and 1918, also studied at the Arts School of the Caucasus Association for Promotion of Fine Arts (known as O. Schmerling School) in Tbilisi. From 1918 to 1919 he studied at the State Free Art Studio of Moscow. He returned to Tbilisi, where he was granted a certificate of professor of Fine Arts and Technical Studies by the People's Commissariat of the Georgian SSR.

In 1921–1922, Kochar was elected to the exhibition commission of the Union of Armenian Artists and became a member of the "HAYARTUN" (House of Armenian Art). By April 1922, he left from Batum and traveled abroad to Constantinople, then to Venice, Rome, Florence and Paris. Kochar's works were first exhibited in Tbilisi in 1921 and the following year in Allied-controlled Constantinople (Istanbul) and in Venice.

Later life and career 
By 1923 Kochar had settled down in Paris, where his art was well received. In 1928 there were reported cases of vandalism towards two sculpture-paintings by Kochar in the exhibition at the Salon des Indépendants. Those works were the first heralds of "Painting in Space".

In February Dr. Alendi delivered a lecture in Sorbonne on Kochar's "new painting". Kochar's Painting in Space one-man show opened in "Van Leer" Gallery. The 15 works presented were new plastic and artistic means of expression which sought to involve time as an additional fourth dimension. The author of the catalogue was French-Polish art critic Waldemar George (1893-1970). In 1929 the international exhibition, "Panorama de L`art contemporain"("Panorama of Contemporary Art") organized in the halls of the "BONAPART" Publishers, Kochar presented the works of "Painting in Space". Among the participants of the exhibition were Georges Braque, Marc Chagall, Robert Delaunay, Henri Matisse, Francis Picabia, Pablo Picasso, Liursa, Joan Miró, Survage, Utrillo, Vlamink, and others. Kochar met Léonce Rosenberg, the well-known patron and connoisseur of modern art, who became a fan of Kochar's art. In 1936, while at the peak of his artistic fame, to the surprise of many, Kochar repatriated to the Armenian SSR, without the least bit of doubt that he was leaving Paris for good.

Between 1941 and 1943 Kochar was imprisoned on politically motivated charges, but was eventually freed due to the intervention of his friends from Nersissian School, Karo Halabian and Anastas Mikoyan.

Yervand Kochar continued working in Yerevan, earning award recognition as People's Artist of Armenian SSR in 1965, State Prize of the Armenian SSR in 1967, Order of the Red Banner of Labour in 1971 and People's Artist of the Soviet Union in 1976.

His most recognized works include the statues of David of Sassoun (1959) which has become the symbol of Yerevan, the capital of Armenia; of Vardan Mamikonian (1975); of Komitas (1969) in Echmiadzin. One of his masterpieces in painting is "Disasters of War".

In 1963 The National Museum of Modern Art Centre Georges Pompidou in Paris acquired one of Kochar's works of "Painting in the Space" (1934).

In 1999 UNESCO marked Kochar's centennial as one of the "outstanding dates" in world art. In 2010 Armenia's Union of Artists opened an exhibit dedicated to Yervand Kochar's artistic legacy marking 110 years since the artist's birth.

He was married to philologist Manik Mkrtchyan (1913–1984), with whom he had two sons, Haykaz Kochar (1946) and Ruben Kochar (1953).

Death and legacy 
He died January 22, 1979, Yerevan, Soviet Armenia. In 1984, a museum in his name was dedicated to his art and opened near Yerevan Cascade, in Yerevan, Armenia.

Filmography 
 Tghamardik (1973) (as Yervand Kochar)

References

External links 

Ervand Konchar Museum
 

1899 births
1979 deaths
20th-century Armenian painters
20th-century Armenian sculptors
Artists from Tbilisi
People from Tiflis Governorate
Nersisian School alumni
People's Artists of the USSR (visual arts)
Recipients of the Order of the Red Banner of Labour
Georgian people of Armenian descent
Armenian artists
Armenian illustrators
Armenian painters
Armenian portrait painters
Armenian sculptors
Armenian still life painters
Soviet Armenians
Soviet artists
Soviet illustrators
Soviet sculptors
Soviet painters
Soviet printmakers
Burials at the Komitas Pantheon